Ledyanaya is a railway station on the Trans–Baikal Railway in Svobodnensky District of Amur Oblast, Russia, located near the towns of Tsiolkovsky and Svobodny. The station was open in 1914, but recently has been heavily used to supply the construction and daily functioning of the newly built spaceport, Vostochny Cosmodrome.

Ledyanaya is located on the line connecting Bamovskaya and Belogorsk. There is infrequent passenger traffic.

References

Railway stations in the Russian Empire opened in 1914
Railway stations in Amur Oblast